Melbourne Commonwealth Games may refer to two Games hosted by Melbourne, Australia:

 2006 Commonwealth Games
 2026 Commonwealth Games (with Geelong, Bendigo, Ballarat, and Gippsland)